The Cornell–Penn football rivalry is an American college football rivalry between the Cornell Big Red and Penn Quakers. Traditionally, the game was played on Thanksgiving Day in Philadelphia, Pennsylvania, but now alternates between Philadelphia and Ithaca, New York. The game was often played as the last game of the regular season for both teams. Beginning in 2018, Cornell has faced Columbia in the last game of the regular season, while Penn plays Princeton in the last game of the regular season. The game was cancelled in 2020 due to the COVID-19 pandemic, marking the first cancellation after an uninterrupted streak of 101 games going back to 1919.

In the 127 meetings since 1893 (interrupted in 1918 and 2020), Penn leads the series 76–47–5, with Penn forfeiting the game in 1997 (because of the participation of an academically ineligible player).

Attendance
The Thanksgiving Cornell–Penn football game, broadcast on national radio before the television era, attracted huge crowds to Franklin Field in Philadelphia. The 1931 game attracted a reported 70,000, and earned a story on the front page of the Philadelphia Inquirer along with a quarter-by-quarter breakdown of every detail of the game. The 1947 game attracted a crowd estimated at "about 80,000". The 1959 game attracted 23,661. By 1965 attendance was down to 10,543, and the Thanksgiving tradition was ended and a standard home-and-away schedule was instituted.

Played in Philadelphia for 69 consecutive meetings from 1894 through 1963 before alternating between Philadelphia and Ithaca, Cornell–Penn is the fifth-most played college football rivalry as of 2022. Dedicated in 1995, the Trustees' Cup has since been awarded annually to the winner of the Cornell–Penn game. Penn has won the Trustees' Cup 19 times to Cornell's 8.

Game results

External links

See also 
 List of NCAA college football rivalry games
 List of most-played college football series in NCAA Division I

References

College football rivalries in the United States
Cornell Big Red football
Penn Quakers football